The German Embassy School Addis Ababa (DBSAA) is a German international school in Addis Ababa, Ethiopia. The school operates from kindergarten, until Grade 10, as well as the BIB International Baccalaureate programme.

DBSAA is supported by German government. In 1965 it had 22 teachers and 221 learners.

References

Notes

Further reading
Manfred Büttner: Die Deutsche Schule Addis Abeba in Rahmen des deutschen Auslandsschulwesens. In: Zeitschrift für Kulturaustausch, Äthiopien, Sonderausgabe 1973, E 7225 F, S. 162–175.
Asfa-Wossen Asserate: Die Deutsche Schule in Addis Abeba - aus äthiopischer Sicht. In: Zeitschrift für Kulturaustausch, Äthiopien, Sonderausgabe 1973, E 7225 F, S. 162–175.

External links

 German Embassy School Addis Ababa

Addis Ababa
International schools in Ethiopia
Schools in Addis Ababa